Honey Puffs (called Honey Weets in Australia) is a breakfast cereal produced by Sanitarium Health and Wellbeing Company and sold in New Zealand and Australia. It is made by puffing pieces of wheat and lightly coating them all over with honey.

Packaging
The box features a bee in a red cap and red shoes surfing on milk using a Honey Puff while being followed by a bee with blue shoes. It is printed on the box that Honey Puffs are made with real honey, don't have any artificial colours or flavours, are nut free for children and are 99% fat-free. The back of the box tells you how to play Sticky Stucky and features the same bee from the front, two bees wearing blue shoes and a bee wearing green shoes all flying around. There are also three bees hiding in between two flowers somehow growing in the hive.

History 
In 2003, Honey Puffs was the only cereal out of nearly two hundred that was judged as "okay" by The Australian Consumers Association, based on nutritional value.

New Zealand television show Studio 2 Live once held "The Honey Puffs Mad Movie Challenge". Competition entries made a short movie including a bee character and a box of Honey Puffs.

References

External links 

 Honey Puffs
 Honey Puffs advertisement

Breakfast cereals
New Zealand cuisine
Sanitarium Health and Wellbeing Company brands
Honey